Kingergali is located in Salarzai, Buner District, Khyber Pakhtunkhwa province, Pakistan. It was part of the Yousafzai State of Swat. It is a small village in the heart of the mountains. The ruins on the slopes of its mountains reflect ancient culture. Its one of the ten villages of Salarzai, District Buner.

Two sub-tribes of Yousafzai inhabitants in Kingergali: Daloo Kheil and Kara Kheil.

Population 
The precise population of Kingergali has not been officially documented. However, according to the unofficial record, its estimated population is approximately 10000–15000.

Education 
There are two primary and two higher secondary schools in the area namely Government Boys Primary Schools, Government Girls Primary Schools, Government Boys high Schools, and Government girls high Schools Kingergali. Also, other private institutions serving in the areas prominently Faran Model School, Oxford English Grammar School, in addition to it there is a religious School namely Madrasa Tu Saleheen and moreover one Another religious institution Madrasa Dar e Ayesha Lilbanat who serving there services in female ILM.

Thoroughfares 
There are three main thoroughfares for vehicular traffic and pedestrians – Kingergaly Nanser Road, Palai Buner Road, and Katlang Buner Road.

Gateway 
Kingergali is the gateway of Buner District.

References

Populated places in Buner District
Tribes of Pakistan